Muhammad Iftikhar Alam is a Pakistani politician who was a member of Pak Sarzameen Party.

Early life 
Iftikhar Alam was born on 16 May 1972 in Karachi, Pakistan. His father is Muhammad Sardar Alam.

Political career

Muttahida Qaumi Movement 
In 2013, Iftikhar won PS-106 (Karachi-XVIII) on the seat of Muttahida Qaumi Movement (MQM).

Pak Sarzameen Party 
In May 2016, Iftikhar left MQM and joined Anis Kaimkhani and Mustafa Kamal's newly formed party called Pak Sarzameen Party. In 2018, Iftikhar contested from PS-126 (Karachi Central 4) from Pak Sarzameen Party. However he received 6184 votes and couldn't win his seat in the Sindh Assembly.

In 2020, Iftikhar Alam was elected as senior joint secretary of Pak Sarzameen Party.

References 

Pak Sarzameen Party members
Living people
1972 births